Richard Pottier (6 June 1906, Graz – 2 November 1994, Le Plessis-Bouchard) was an Austrian-born French film director. He was born in the Austro-Hungarian Empire as Ernst Deutsch.

Selected filmography
 A Rare Bird (1935)
 Fanfare of Love (1935)
 Guilty Melody (1936)
 27 Rue de la Paix (1936)
 The Secrets of the Red Sea (1937)
 Lights of Paris (1938)
 Mademoiselle Swing (1942)
 Picpus (1943)
 Majestic Hotel Cellars (1945)
 Song of the Clouds (1946)
 The Uncatchable Mr. Frederic (1946)
 The White Night (1948)
 Barry (1949)
 Two Loves (1949)
 Meutres? (1950)
 Casimir (1950)
 Darling Caroline  (1951)
 Rendezvous in Grenada (1951)
 Imperial Violets (1952)
 The Beautiful Otero (1954)
 The Lebanese Mission (1956)
The Singer from Mexico (1957)
  (1958)
 Tabarin (1958)
 David and Goliath (1960)
 Il ratto delle sabine (1961)

References

External links

1906 births
1994 deaths
Film people from Graz
People from the Duchy of Styria
French film directors